Ubinsky District is an administrative and municipal district (raion), one of the thirty in Novosibirsk Oblast, Russia. It is located in the center of the oblast. Its administrative center is the rural locality (a selo) of Ubinskoye. Population: 16,297 (2010 Census);  The population of Ubinskoye accounts for 35.8% of the district's total population. The district's name comes from Lake Ubinskoye, which is mostly located inside the district.

References

Notes

Sources

Districts of Novosibirsk Oblast